The meridian 22° east of Greenwich is a line of longitude that extends from the North Pole across the Arctic Ocean, the Atlantic Ocean, Europe, Africa, the Indian Ocean, the Southern Ocean, and Antarctica to the South Pole.

The 22nd meridian east forms a great circle with the 158th meridian west.

Part of the border between Angola and Zambia is defined by the meridian.

From Pole to Pole
Starting at the North Pole and heading south to the South Pole, the 22nd meridian east passes through:

{| class="wikitable plainrowheaders"
! scope="col" width="125" | Co-ordinates
! scope="col" | Country, territory or sea
! scope="col" | Notes
|-
| style="background:#b0e0e6;" | 
! scope="row" style="background:#b0e0e6;" | Arctic Ocean
| style="background:#b0e0e6;" |
|-
| 
! scope="row" | 
| Island of Nordaustlandet, Svalbard
|-
| style="background:#b0e0e6;" | 
! scope="row" style="background:#b0e0e6;" | Barents Sea
| style="background:#b0e0e6;" |
|-
| 
! scope="row" | 
| Islands of Barentsøya and Edgeøya, Svalbard
|-
| style="background:#b0e0e6;" | 
! scope="row" style="background:#b0e0e6;" | Barents Sea
| style="background:#b0e0e6;" |
|-
| style="background:#b0e0e6;" | 
! scope="row" style="background:#b0e0e6;" | Atlantic Ocean
| style="background:#b0e0e6;" | Norwegian Sea
|-
| 
! scope="row" | 
| Island of Sørøya
|-
| style="background:#b0e0e6;" | 
! scope="row" style="background:#b0e0e6;" | Atlantic Ocean
| style="background:#b0e0e6;" | Norwegian Sea
|-
| 
! scope="row" | 
|
|-
| 
! scope="row" | 
|
|-
| 
! scope="row" | 
|
|-
| style="background:#b0e0e6;" | 
! scope="row" style="background:#b0e0e6;" | Baltic Sea
| style="background:#b0e0e6;" | Gulf of Bothnia
|-valign="top"
| 
! scope="row" | 
| The mainland and several islands, including Luonnonmaa and Lillandet
|-valign="top"
| style="background:#b0e0e6;" | 
! scope="row" style="background:#b0e0e6;" | Baltic Sea
| style="background:#b0e0e6;" | Passing just west of the island of Hiiumaa, 
|-
| 
! scope="row" | 
| Island of Saaremaa
|-
| style="background:#b0e0e6;" | 
! scope="row" style="background:#b0e0e6;" | Baltic Sea
| style="background:#b0e0e6;" | 
|-
| 
! scope="row" | 
| Island of Saaremaa
|-
| style="background:#b0e0e6;" | 
! scope="row" style="background:#b0e0e6;" | Baltic Sea
| style="background:#b0e0e6;" |
|-
| 
! scope="row" | 
|
|-
| 
! scope="row" | 
|
|-
| 
! scope="row" | 
| Kaliningrad Oblast (exclave)
|-
| 
! scope="row" | 
| Passing through Rzeszów
|-
| 
! scope="row" | 
|
|-
| 
! scope="row" | 
|
|-
| 
! scope="row" | 
|
|-
| 
! scope="row" | 
| Passing just east of Leskovac
|-
| 
! scope="row" | 
|
|-
| 
! scope="row" | 
|
|-
| style="background:#b0e0e6;" | 
! scope="row" style="background:#b0e0e6;" | Gulf of Corinth
| style="background:#b0e0e6;" |
|-
| 
! scope="row" | 
| Peloponnese
|-
| style="background:#b0e0e6;" | 
! scope="row" style="background:#b0e0e6;" | Mediterranean Sea
| style="background:#b0e0e6;" |
|-
| 
! scope="row" | 
|
|-
| 
! scope="row" | 
|
|-
| 
! scope="row" | 
|
|-
| 
! scope="row" | 
|
|-
| 
! scope="row" | 
|
|-
| 
! scope="row" | 
|
|-
| 
! scope="row" | 
|
|-
| 
! scope="row" |   /  border
|
|-
| 
! scope="row" | 
|
|-
| 
! scope="row" | 
| Caprivi Strip
|-
| 
! scope="row" | 
|
|-valign="top"
| 
! scope="row" | 
| Northern Cape Western Cape
|-
| style="background:#b0e0e6;" | 
! scope="row" style="background:#b0e0e6;" | Indian Ocean
| style="background:#b0e0e6;" |
|-
| style="background:#b0e0e6;" | 
! scope="row" style="background:#b0e0e6;" | Southern Ocean
| style="background:#b0e0e6;" |
|-
| 
! scope="row" | Antarctica
| Queen Maud Land, claimed by 
|-
|}

Meridian 22.5° East

Meridian 22.5° East crosses most countries (sovereign states) from all meridians: 26 in total. When Svalbard (in the North) and Antarctica (in the South) are added it crosses 28 territories.

From North to South: Norway, Finland, Sweden, Estonia, Latvia, Lithuania, Russia (Kaliningrad), Poland, Slovakia, Ukraine, Hungary, Romania, Serbia, Bulgaria, North Macedonia, Greece, Libya, Chad, Sudan, Central African Republic, Congo Democratic Republic, Angola, Zambia, Namibia, Botswana and South Africa.

The line could be drawn from Tappeluft in Norway (the most northern town on mainland on this meridian) to George in South Africa (the most southern city on this meridian) which is 11,573 km. It crosses also Turku in Finland. Meridian 22° East misses Ukraine  and Bulgaria and Meridian 23° East misses Russia (Kaliningrad) and Slovakia. Halfway both meridians, on 22.5° EL, those missing countries are on the line.

See also
21st meridian east
23rd meridian east

e022 meridian east
Angola–Zambia border